Bacchisa rigida is a species of beetle in the family Cerambycidae. It was described by Gressitt in 1942. It is known from China.

References

R
Beetles described in 1942